SXW refers to:
  a file format of OpenOffice.org XML
 West Sussex, county in England, Chapman code